Oscillaria is a genus of filamentous diatoms.

References

External links 
 Oscillaria on www.algaebase.org

Diatom genera